Shibidi or Shibiri Ekunpa is a town located in Ojo local government area of Lagos State, Nigeria. Ruled by a traditional ruler, its ZIP code is 102111.

References

Populated places in Lagos